Casanare may refer to:

 Casanare Department, an administrative division in Colombia
 Los Llanos del Casanare, a province of the Viceroyalty of New Granada
 Casanare River, a tributary of the Meta River in Colombia
 Casanare, Colombia, a settlement in Colombia on the Casanare River